iSimangaliso Wetland Park (previously known as the Greater St. Lucia Wetland Park) is situated on the east coast of KwaZulu-Natal, South Africa, about  north of Durban by road. The park includes:
 Lake St. Lucia
 St. Lucia Game Reserve
 False Bay Park
 Kosi Bay
 Lake Eteza Nature Reserve
 Lake Sibhayi
 St. Lucia Marine Reserve
 St. Lucia Marine Sanctuary
 Sodwana Bay National Park
 Mapelane Nature Reserve
 Maputaland Marine Protected Area
 Cape Vidal
 Ozabeni
 Mfabeni
 Tewate Wilderness Area
 Mkuze Game Reserve

The park was previously known as the Greater St. Lucia Wetland Park, but was renamed effective 1 November 2007. The word isimangaliso means "a miracle" or "something wondrous" in Zulu. The name came as a result of Shaka's subject having been sent to the land of the Tsonga. When he came back he described the beauty that he saw as a miracle.

Transfrontier parks
The park is part of a transfrontier marine park, the Ponta do Ouro-Kosi Bay Transfrontier Conservation Area, straddling South Africa, Mozambique, and Eswatini. The marine conservation area is included in the Greater Lubombo Transfrontier Conservation Area.

History
Until 1895, the bay had been a home of the Tsonga people and their Tsonga fish kraal. This is the original and the natural home of the Tsonga people and they have lived here for more than 1000 years. Records from early Portuguese sailors rightfully point out this area to be occupied by the Tsonga people and further down south. The area was also known as Tembeland or Thongaland but the name fell into disuse around the early 1900s. The area was ruled by a Tsonga branch of the Vahlanganu (Tembe). The Swiss missionary, Reverend Henri-Alexandre Junod (known as HA Junod), conducted a scientific and ethnographic study of the Tsonga people during the early 1890s and produced a detailed map, showing the occupation of the bay by the Tsonga Tembe people. Junod showed in his map that the area was known as Tembeland and that the Tembe capital city was located in the St Lucia bay, and that by 1906, the Tsonga people occupied the land from St Lucia to Valdezia in the Spelenkon district of the Transvaal province, known today as Limpopo Province. St Lucia bay and Maputo bay are one land and they belong to the Tsonga people, Tsonga villages were built from St Lucia bay until Maputo and they were not separated by any natural division. Around St Lucia, the ruling chief was the Tembe Royal Family, while around Maputo, the ruling class was the Maputo royal family, who are all of the Vahlanganu branch of the Tsonga people. In and around Maputo and St Lucia bay (Tembeland), the language spoken is Ronga, which according to the Swiss Missionary, Rev HA Junod, is not an independent language but a dialect of Xitsonga. According to Rev Junod, Ronga language is so similar to Xitsonga that it cannot be regarded an independent language but is a dialect of a major language known today as Xitsonga.

St. Lucia was first named in 1554 Rio dos Medos do Ouro (alternatively Rio dos Médãos do Ouro — River of the Gold Dunes) by the survivors of the Portuguese ship Saint Benedict. At this stage, only the Tugela River mouth was known as St. Lucia. Later, in 1575, the Tugela River was named Tugela. On 13 December 1575, the day of the feast of Saint Lucy, Manuel Peresterello renamed the mouth area to Santa Lucia.
In 1822, St. Lucia was proclaimed by the British as a township.
In 1971, St. Lucia Lake and the turtle beaches and coral reefs of Maputaland have been listed by the Convention on Wetlands of International Importance (Ramsar Convention).
In December 1999, the park was declared a UNESCO World Heritage Site at an unveiling ceremony, where Nelson Mandela was the guest of honour.

Biodiversity

The park was proclaimed a world heritage site because of the rich biodiversity, unique ecosystems and natural beauty occurring in a relatively small area. The reason for the huge diversity in fauna and flora is the great variety of different ecosystems on the park, ranging from coral reefs and sandy beaches to subtropical dune forests, savannas, and wetlands. Animals occurring on the park include elephant, leopard, black and southern white rhino, Cape buffalo, and in the ocean, whales, dolphins, and marine turtles including the leatherback and loggerhead turtles.

The park is also home to 1,200 crocodiles and 800 hippopotami.

In December 2013, after 44 years of absence, African lions were reintroduced to iSimangaliso.

There are large outcroppings of underwater reefs which are home to brightly coloured fish and corals. Some of the most spectacular coral diversity in the world is located in Sodwana Bay. The reefs are inhabited by colour-changing octopuses and squid ready to ambush unsuspecting prey. Occasionally gigantic whale sharks can be seen gliding through the water, mouth agape to scoop up tiny plankton.

Twenty-four species of bivalve molluscs are recorded in St. Lucia Lake, which constitutes a considerable portion of the park.

See also
 List of World Heritage Sites in Africa
 Protected areas of South Africa

Notes

References

External links

 St Lucia
 Official site of iSimangaliso Wetland Park
 St. Lucia South Africa Website
 Lake St. Lucia

World Heritage Sites in South Africa
Umfolozi River
1895 in South Africa
Ezemvelo KZN Wildlife Parks
Ramsar sites in South Africa